Wasum is a village in Chitral district, 130 km north of Chitral. About 1,700 families live within the settlement. 

Melph dates to the 800's AD, when migrant groups from Afghanistan and other neighboring countries escaping various conflicts established the community. Few visit there today because of the harsh weather and poor road system.

References

Chitral District
Hill stations in Pakistan
Populated places along the Silk Road